Statistics of Úrvalsdeild in the 1931 season.

Overview
Four teams participated in the 20th season of Icelandic league football. KR won the championship for the 7th time.

League standings

Results

References

Úrvalsdeild karla (football) seasons
Iceland
Iceland
Urvalsdeild